Mehrabad International Airport (Foroudgâh-e Beyn Almelali-ye Mehrâbâd) , is an international airport serving Tehran, the capital city of Iran. Prior to the construction of the larger Imam Khomeini International Airport in 2007, Mehrabad was Tehran's primary airport in both international and domestic traffic, but now serves only domestic flights. Despite this, in 2016 Mehrabad Airport was the busiest airport in Iran in terms of passengers, handling 16,678,351 passengers in total. The airport is also used by the Government of Iran and is one of the bases of the Iranian Air Force.

History 

The airport was used for the first time as an airfield for aviation club planes in 1938, then after World War II along with becoming internationally recognized by joining Iran civil aviation organization to the ICAO in 1949, the airport also became an air force base.

Newly delivered Republic F-84G Thunderjets (fighter) and Lockheed T-33A Shooting Star (trainer) arrived, May 1957 and April 1956, respectively. Iranian Air Force. In 1955 just after construction of first asphalt paved runway a new terminal building (Current Terminal 1) for both international and domestic flights was designed and constructed. Among the designers of the initial modern buildings of the airport was the famous architect William Pereira.

In 1961, Mehrabad Airport added a side building (current Terminal 2) used for arrival flights.

The new Tehran Imam Khomeini International Airport (IKA) was scheduled to open in 2004 with international flights gradually changing from Mehrabad starting with flights to countries bordering the Persian Gulf. After IKA's initial opening in May 2004, due to complications, it was not until the end of 2007 that the plan to move the majority of international flights to the new airport was completed. All international flights have now been moved to IKA.

In June 2020, Mehrabad Airport announced a new terminal to replace Terminals 4 and 6. The new terminal is to have 20 gates (10 with jetbridges) and a new CIP Terminal. It is not known when construction will start.

Facilities
Mehrabad International Airport consists of six terminals:

 VIP Terminal is used for Meraj Airlines for Governmental flights.
 CIP Terminal can be used at a passenger's request. The Terminal is open to all guests, from any airline.
 Terminals 1 and 2 handles departures and arrivals for ATA Airlines, Iran Air, Iran Airtour, Kish Air, Meraj Airlines, Qeshm Air, and Zagros Airlines. 
 Terminals 4 and 6 handle departures and arrivals for Caspian Airlines, Iran Aseman Airlines, Mahan Air, Varesh Airlines, and all the other airlines.
 Terminals 3 is used for all cargo flights.
 Terminal Crew is used for the flight crews of all airlines.

An aircraft engineering and maintenance company called Fajr Ashian has a maintenance hangar adjacent to main airport premises. The hangar is linked to Mehrabad Airport through a taxiway crossing "Tehran-Karaj" Highway. Fajr Ashian takes care of aircraft of many companies, including Iran Air, Mahan Air, Meraj Airlines.

Airlines and destinations

Passenger

Statistics

Annual traffic

Other facilities 
The airport is home to the head offices of Iran Air and the Iran Civil Aviation Organization. In addition the Iranian Airports Company also has its head office at Mehrabad Airport, nearby Terminal 2.

Mehrabad Weather Station

Mehrabad airport synoptic weather station officially started its activity with the beginning of World War II in order to provide weather reports. This station is an airport and upper atmosphere synoptic station, whose synoptic activity includes measuring, recording and reporting various atmospheric parameters such as wind direction and speed, cloudiness, detecting various atmospheric phenomena, etc. in the form of synoptic, meter and spatial reports. and it is provided to the watch tower and at the same time it is sent to the forecast center of the country's meteorological organization for review to issue a forecast.
 
In the upper atmosphere section, a radiosonde with a balloon is released in the sky in two shifts at 00:00 and 12:00 hours (UTC) to check the atmospheric conditions in the upper atmosphere. The information obtained from Radio Sound is drawn by the plotter on the Scioti map. Using this map, parameters such as water vapor pressure, saturated vapor pressure, potential temperature, mixing ratio, relative humidity, wet temperature, equivalent temperature, equivalent potential temperature, virtual temperature, pressure model (L-C-L) and also Obtained indices (SI, KA-I) which are criteria for detecting instability and cumulonimbus cloud formation and occurrence of lightning.

Climatic characteristics in the general scale of the region, like other parts of Tehran province, are affected by the northern, northwestern and western systems, especially the southwestern, and its atmospheric precipitation, which starts from the months of November and December and continues until the middle of May, in the cold seasons of the year. It is a function of the activities of the above systems.
In terms of micro-climatic features, the region has some index coordinates that are mentioned:
In terms of climate, Tehran region is influenced by the Alborz highlands, which due to the temperature difference especially at night and the cooling of the northern highlands at night, a gentle wind blows from the mountain to the plain (north to south) and from the plain to the mountain (south to north) during the day.
Regarding the summer rains in Tehran, it can be said that sometimes the collision of two hot southern and relatively cold and humid northern air masses that take place in the upper levels of the Alborz region, causes very active boiling clouds in the region. appeared and caused severe downpours that are often accompanied by floods.
Some of the climatic characteristics of the Mehrabad synoptic station in the statistical period of 1971 to 2001 are as follows:
The average annual rainfall is 238.9 mm and the years 1995-96 and 1996-97 are the wettest and driest years with rainfall of 353.6 and 92.9 mm, respectively. Of the total annual rainfall, the amount of 176.0 mm (73.7 percent) in the first half of the agricultural year (autumn and winter) and the amount of 57.9 mm (24.2 percent) in the third quarter (spring) and the rest 5.0 mm (1.2 percent) is also distributed in the summer season. The highest monthly rainfall record in Mehrabad was 119.4 mm in March.
The absolute minimum and maximum temperature is -10.0 and 42.6 degrees, respectively, and the annual average is 17.7 degrees Celsius. July with an average high of 36.4 degrees Celsius and January with average low of 0.7 degrees Celsius are the hottest and coldest months of the year, respectively.
The sum of thermal units above zero degree days and the sum of thermal units above ten degrees days have been obtained.
The average number of freezing days with thresholds of zero, -4 is 50, 12 days respectively.
The annual average relative humidity is 41% and the maximum and minimum averages are 56% and 28%, respectively.
The total annual evaporation from class A pan is more than 2500 mm. January and July have the lowest and the highest amount of evaporation, respectively.
The average annual sunny hours during the statistical period is 3025 hours.
The prevailing wind in Mehrabad, which is calculated based on three observation times (morning, noon and evening), is in the west direction and its average is 5.5 meters per second. The highest wind speed in Mehr Abad is 25 meters per second from the northwest and the average wind speed is 2.6 meters per second.

The weather station was established in 1942. Its elevation is 1190.8 meters above sea level and it is located inside the runway of Mehrabad airport and its distance to the border of the city is 8 km. The main watershed for Mehrabad is the Kan Creek.It has a dry (Silianinov co-climate) climatic feature and the soil type is sedimentary and the main vegetation type of the area is hand-planted trees.

Climate 

Mehrabad International Airport has a cold semi-arid climate (BSk).

Accidents and incidents 
 On 15 March 1974 a Sterling Airways Sud Aviation Caravelle suffered a landing gear failure. As the aircraft was taxiing, the right main landing gear failed, causing the right wing to collapse and catch fire. Fifteen passengers were killed in the accident.
 On 5 December 1974 a roof collapsed, killing 17 and injuring dozens more.
 On 8 February 1993 a mid-air collision occurred between Iran Air Tours Tupolev Tu-154M and IRIAF Sukhoi Su-24 killing all 133 people on board both aircraft involved.
 On 20 April 2005, a Boeing 707-3J9C had an accident while landing in Mehrabad airport. After touchdown on runway 29L problems with the undercarriage (failure of landing gear or a burst tire) caused the Boeing 707 to slide off the runway into the Kan River. Three passengers were killed after they fell in the river during the evacuation.
 On 19 June 2005 a Northwest Airlines DC-10 en route from Mumbai to Amsterdam made an emergency landing at Mehrabad Airport due to an indication of a fire in the cargo hold, which turned out to be a false alarm. The plane left 8 hours later without incident.
 On 6 December 2005 an Iranian Air Force C-130 Hercules crashed in Tehran shortly after taking off from the airport.
 On 2 January 2008, an Iran Air Fokker 100 (EP-IDB) plane carrying 100 passengers skidded off the runway after part of its wing caught fire when attempting to take off on a domestic flight to Shiraz Airport. The landing gear disintegrated and the ensuing fire partially consumed the wings. No one was injured in the accident, which happened around 07:30 IRST amid heavy snowfall at the airport.
 On 10 August 2014 Sepahan Airlines Flight 5915, an HESA IrAn-140, crashed shortly after takeoff from Mehrabad International Airport. The aircraft experienced engine malfunction and attempted a return to the airport 4 minutes after takeoff, but was unable to maintain altitude and crashed into a residential area. 39 people were killed and 9 were injured.
 On 15 October 2015 a Mahan Air Boeing 747 en route to Bandar Abbas in southern Iran lost pieces of an engine after take-off, returning for a successful emergency landing. None of the 300 people on board were injured.
On 19 March 2019 a Fokker 100 (registration: EP-IDG) had an emergency landing with its main landing gear not extended. Nobody was injured in the accident.

Access
The airport is served by two stations of the Tehran Metro:
Mehrabad Airport Terminal1&2 Metro Station
Mehrabad Airport Terminal4&6 Metro Station

In popular culture
The 2011 video game Battlefield 3 features a mission titled "Going Hunting" which requires the player to carry out aerial attacks on the airport.
The 2012 movie "Argo", directed by Ben Affleck also features this airport.

See also
Iran Civil Aviation Organization
Transport in Iran
List of airports in Iran
List of the busiest airports in Iran
List of airlines of Iran
Meraj Airlines

References

External links 

Official website
 
 

1938 establishments in Iran
Airports in Iran
Transport in Tehran
Buildings and structures in Tehran
William Pereira buildings
Airfields of the United States Army Air Forces Air Transport Command in the Middle East
Airfields of the United States Army Air Forces
World War II airfields in Iran
Airports established in 1938